Uirassu beckeri is a species of beetle in the family Cerambycidae, the only species in the genus Uirassu.

References

Ibidionini
Monotypic insect genera